Beverly Hills Cop: Axel Foley is an upcoming American buddy cop action comedy film directed by Mark Molloy, from a screenplay by Will Beall, and starring Eddie Murphy. It will be the fourth installment in the Beverly Hills Cop film series and the sequel to Beverly Hills Cop (1984), Beverly Hills Cop II (1987), and Beverly Hills Cop III (1994). Beverly Hills Cop: Axel Foley is set to be released on Netflix.

The film entered development in the mid-1990s, under Murphy's production company. It entered a complicated production process with various directors and screenwriters attached at various points. Filmmakers Brett Ratner and Adil El Arbi and Bilall Fallah were initially signed to direct during various points in development. Molloy was hired to direct in April 2022, with production beginning in California that August.

Premise
Axel Foley returns to Beverly Hills to investigate corruption within the force of the Beverly Hills Police Department with his daughter and her ex-boyfriend, after the death of an old friend.

Cast
 Eddie Murphy as Axel Foley, a street-smart police lieutenant from Detroit, Michigan, who frequently traveled to Beverly Hills to investigate crimes that previously had mutual colleagues or friends of his wounded or killed.
 Judge Reinhold as Lt. William "Billy" Rosewood, John Taggart's former partner in the Beverly Hills Police Department.
 Paul Reiser as Det. Jeffrey Friedman, Axel's partner in the Detroit Police Department. Reiser returns to the role after 35 years from Beverly Hills Cop II.
 John Ashton as Sgt. John Taggart, Billy Rosewood's former partner in the Beverly Hills Police Department who retired from the force as of Beverly Hills Cop III. Ashton returns to the role after 35 years from Beverly Hills Cop II.
 Bronson Pinchot as Serge, a former art gallery salesman turned weapons dealer that worked for Victor Maitland. Pinchot returns to the role after 28 years from Beverly Hills Cop III.
 Taylour Paige
 Joseph Gordon-Levitt
 Kevin Bacon
 Mark Pellegrino

Production

Development
A fourth entry in the series was initially announced for release in the mid-1990s, under the production of Eddie Murphy's own production company "Eddie Murphy Productions", though production later fizzled out. It was re-announced in 2006, when producer Jerry Bruckheimer announced his intention to resurrect the film series, though he eventually gave up his option to produce the film, instead passing production duties to Lorenzo di Bonaventura. In September 2006 a script, an amalgamation of several earlier drafts, was presented to Murphy who was reported to be "very happy" with the outline which was described as an attempt to recapture the "feel of the original". Murphy admitted one of his motivations for making a fourth Beverly Hills Cop film was to make up for the fact that the third film was "horrible" and that "he didn't want to leave (the series) like that".

In May 2008, Rush Hour director Brett Ratner was officially named director, who promised the film would return under the series' standard "R" rating, rather than as a rumored watered down PG-13. Michael Brandt and Derek Haas were hired as screenwriters to improve on the existing script in July 2008 and completed a new script, under the working title Beverly Hills Cop 2009, which would see Foley return to Beverly Hills to investigate the murder of his friend Billy Rosewood. The script was eventually rejected, leaving Ratner to work on a new idea. In an interview with Empire magazine, Ratner stated "I'm working very hard on the fourth. It's very difficult, especially since there were three before. We're trying to figure out some important things, like where do we start? Is Axel retired? Is he in Beverly Hills? Is he on vacation? Does Judge Reinhold return as the loveable Billy Rosewood? Many questions to figure out, but I'm hoping to have a script before film disappears from our existence." Although Murphy himself committed to the project, it was unconfirmed whether the series' other principal actors, Judge Reinhold, John Ashton, Ronny Cox, or Bronson Pinchot would also return, though Ratner stated in late 2009 that he was trying to convince Reinhold and Ashton to reprise their roles. Harold Faltermeyer's "Axel F", however, would definitely be returning for the proposed fourth installment, with Ratner quoted as saying  "It'll be back but it'll be a whole new interpretation." On November 15, 2010, Ratner stated in an interview with MTV that there was still a possibility that they will make a fourth film, but that it wouldn't be "anytime soon."

In October 2011, Murphy discussed a possible fourth film, stating, "They're not doing it. What I'm trying to do now is produce a TV show starring Axel Foley's son, and Axel is the chief of police now in Detroit. I'd do the pilot, show up here and there. None of the movie scripts were right; it was trying to force the premise. If you have to force something, you shouldn't be doing it. It was always a rehash of the old thing. It was always wrong." During late Summer 2013, after CBS decided to pass on the TV series, Paramount decided to move forward with the fourth film. On September 13, 2013, Jerry Bruckheimer stated he was in talks to produce. On December 6, 2013, it was announced that Eddie Murphy will again reprise the role of Axel Foley and Brett Ratner will direct. On May 2, 2014, Deadline announced that screenwriters Josh Appelbaum and Andre Nemec would be penning the screenplay.

On June 27, 2014, in an interview with Rolling Stone, Murphy discussed returning to the edgier type character of Axel Foley after years of making family-friendly films. "I haven't done a street guy, working class, a blue-collar character in ages so maybe it's like, 'Oh, wow, I didn't remember he was able to do that,'" Murphy said. According to studio reports on the film's plot, Foley will return to Detroit after leaving his job in Beverly Hills and he will be faced with the coldest winter on record to navigate the new rules and old enemies of one of America's most tenacious cities. The state of Michigan approved $13.5 million in film incentives, based on an estimated $56.6 million of filmmaker spending in the state. The film will be shot in and around Detroit and is estimated to provide jobs for 352 workers. The film was originally scheduled for a March 25, 2016 release, but on May 6, 2015, Paramount Pictures pulled Beverly Hills Cop IV from its release schedule, due to script concerns.
On June 14, 2016, Deadline Hollywood reported that Adil El Arbi and Bilall Fallah, directors of the Belgian drama Black, would direct the film. In January 2017, it was revealed that a new entry in the franchise, Beverly Hills Cop IV would commence filming in June 2017 with Eddie Murphy reprising his role as Axel Foley, and Adil El Arbi and Bilall Fallah as directors. In September, Arbi and Fallah have interest in casting Tom Hardy or Channing Tatum to star alongside Murphy.

In August 2019, the film was described as still in the developmental phase. On October 1, 2019, in an interview with Collider, Murphy announced that principal photography will commence after the filming of Coming 2 America has wrapped. On November 14, 2019, Deadline Hollywood announced that Paramount Pictures made a one-time license deal, with an option for a sequel, with Netflix to develop the film. In May 2020, after delays in the filmmaking business caused by the COVID-19 pandemic, Arbi and Fallah confirmed they are still attached as co-directors and that a new screenwriter was working on a new script for the film. In April 2022, Arbi and Fallah left the film to focus on Batgirl (2022), with Mark Molloy hired to replace them. In the same article, Will Beall was announced to have penned the script.

Filming
In February 2022, the film entered pre-production and received a California state tax credit of $16,059,000. Principal photography began on August 29, 2022, in San Bernardino, along with other areas in California, for 58 days, to generate $78 million in qualified spending in tax incentives. In August 2022, Taylour Paige and Joseph Gordon-Levitt were cast in undisclosed roles. In the same month, Paul Reiser and John Ashton were confirmed to reprise their roles as Det. Jeffrey Friedman and Sgt. John Taggart, respectively, from the first two films. In September, Judge Reinhold and Bronson Pinchot were confirmed to reprise their roles as Sgt. William "Billy" Rosewood and Serge respectively, with Kevin Bacon and Mark Pellegrino also joining the cast.

Release
Beverly Hills Cop: Axel Foley is set to be released by Netflix, in the United States.

References

External links
 

American action comedy films
American buddy comedy films
American buddy cop films
American police detective films
American sequel films
4
English-language Netflix original films
Fictional portrayals of the Detroit Police Department
Films about murder
Films postponed due to the COVID-19 pandemic
Films produced by Jerry Bruckheimer
Films scored by Harold Faltermeyer
Films set in Beverly Hills, California
Films set in Detroit
Films set in Los Angeles
Films shot in California
Films with screenplays by Will Beall
Upcoming directorial debut films
Upcoming Netflix original films
Paramount Pictures films
Upcoming sequel films